Lumsden is a town in Southland, New Zealand. Lying in a gap in the surrounding hills, Lumsden is the location of a major junction on state highway six. Lumsden is 81 kilometres north of Invercargill, 106 kilometres south  of Queenstown, 59 kilometres west of Gore and 77 kilometres east of Te Anau.

History

Originally the district in general was known as The Elbow. When this name was given to the then new railway station, residents of Castlerock, then also known as The Elbow and on the opposite bank of the Ōreti River, brought the matter to George Lumsden of the Otago Provincial Council. He referred that matter to the Railways Department who, in the absence of any other suggestion, chose the name Lumsden for the town. 

In 2017, it was suggested that Lumsden is becoming a satellite town on Queenstown. It was much cheaper to buy or rent a house in Lumsden and then work in Queenstown where wages are potentially higher.

Railways

Lumsden also used to be a major railway junction with lines departing to all four points of the compass.  The Kingston Branch from Invercargill ran north–south through the town, while to the west was the Mossburn Branch and to the east was the Waimea Plains Railway that connected with the Main South Line in Gore.  In 1971, most of the Waimea Plains Railway closed, but sixteen kilometres from Lumsden to Balfour remained open until 1978.  In 1979, the line north to Kingston was closed after repairs to flood damage would not have been economic, and both the Mossburn Branch and the connection south to Invercargill closed in December 1982.  

The railway station is now preserved as a tourist information centre. The Lumsden Heritage Trust, formed in 2013 has recovered and restored original carriages and trains.  It has displayed the chassis of New Zealand Railways steam locomotive P 60 at the town's southern entrance, as well as two unrestored locomotives, V 126 and V 127, two Drewry diesel shunters and three wagons by the old station, to commemorate its former prominent status in New Zealand's national rail network. In April 2022 a historic 1883 A Class 199 elevated roof passenger carriage was added to the Lumsden Railway precinct.

Demographics
Lumsden is described as a rural settlement by Statistics New Zealand.

Lumsden had a population of 492 at the 2018 New Zealand census, an increase of 72 people (17.1%) since the 2013 census, and an increase of 66 people (15.5%) since the 2006 census. There were 228 households. There were 258 males and 237 females, giving a sex ratio of 1.09 males per female, with 99 people (20.1%) aged under 15 years, 99 (20.1%) aged 15 to 29, 213 (43.3%) aged 30 to 64, and 81 (16.5%) aged 65 or older.

Ethnicities were 87.2% European/Pākehā, 12.2% Māori, 1.2% Pacific peoples, 6.7% Asian, and 1.8% other ethnicities (totals add to more than 100% since people could identify with multiple ethnicities).

Although some people objected to giving their religion, 55.5% had no religion, 31.1% were Christian, 1.2% were Hindu, 0.6% were Muslim, and 0.6% were Buddhist.

Of those at least 15 years old, 48 (12.2%) people had a bachelor or higher degree, and 120 (30.5%) people had no formal qualifications. The employment status of those at least 15 was that 189 (48.1%) people were employed full-time, 63 (16.0%) were part-time, and 15 (3.8%) were unemployed.

Lumsden-Balfour

Lumsden-Balfour had a population of 1,320 at the 2018 New Zealand census, an increase of 54 people (4.3%) since the 2013 census, and an increase of 108 people (8.9%) since the 2006 census. There were 531 households. There were 711 males and 609 females, giving a sex ratio of 1.17 males per female. The median age was 36.9 years (compared with 37.4 years nationally), with 300 people (22.7%) aged under 15 years, 231 (17.5%) aged 15 to 29, 597 (45.2%) aged 30 to 64, and 195 (14.8%) aged 65 or older.

Ethnicities were 88.6% European/Pākehā, 8.4% Māori, 0.7% Pacific peoples, 6.1% Asian, and 2.0% other ethnicities (totals add to more than 100% since people could identify with multiple ethnicities).

The proportion of people born overseas was 13.0%, compared with 27.1% nationally.

Although some people objected to giving their religion, 50.9% had no religion, 39.5% were Christian, 0.7% were Hindu, 0.2% were Muslim, 0.5% were Buddhist and 1.1% had other religions.

Of those at least 15 years old, 159 (15.6%) people had a bachelor or higher degree, and 237 (23.2%) people had no formal qualifications. The median income was $36,500, compared with $31,800 nationally. 138 people (13.5%) earned over $70,000 compared to 17.2% nationally. The employment status of those at least 15 was that 579 (56.8%) people were employed full-time, 177 (17.4%) were part-time, and 21 (2.1%) were unemployed.

Education
Lumsden School is a contributing primary school for years 1 to 6 with a roll of  students as of 

Northern Southland College is a secondary school for years 7 to 13 with a roll of  students. The college opened in 1976, replacing Lumsden District High School which ran from 1962 to 1975.

Born in Lumsden
 Cathy Baker (16 October 1957), New Zealand field-hockey player
 Bill English (30 December 1961), New Zealand Prime Minister (2016–2017)
 Daryl Gibson (2 March 1975), New Zealand rugby-union player and coach
 Amy Rule (15 July 2000), New Zealand rugby-union player

References

External links
Lumsden community website

Populated places in Southland, New Zealand